Domenik is a masculine given name. Notable people with the name include:

 Domenik Hixon (born 1984), American football player
 Domenik Osen (1891–1970), Austrian mime artist

See also
 Domenic
 Dominic

Masculine given names